"What You Need" is episode 12 of the American television anthology series The Twilight Zone. It is based on the short story of the same name by Lewis Padgett (Henry Kuttner and C. L. Moore), which was published in the October 1945 issue of Astounding Science Fiction magazine.

Opening narration

Plot
Pedott, a peddler, has the curious ability to give people exactly what they need before they need it. He enters a bar, where he first gives a woman a vial of cleaning fluid. Then he gives a down-on-his-luck ex-baseball player a bus ticket to Scranton, Pennsylvania. Moments later, via the establishment's pay phone, the ball player receives a job offer in Scranton.  He is to meet the General Manager of a team he has been hired to coach and wishes the spot he notices on his jacket could be cleaned away, so he could look his best. The woman approaches and offers to use her cleaning fluid to remove it.  The two are clearly drawn to each other.

Fred Renard, a frustrated, arrogant loser-type, asks Pedott to give him what he needs, and the peddler gives him a pair of scissors, which save Renard's life when his scarf later gets caught in an elevator's doors. Renard shows up at Pedott's apartment, asking for another thing he "needs", and the peddler produces a leaky fountain pen which predicts a winning racehorse when a drop of its ink lands on a newspaper racing column.

Renard continues menacing Pedott for more and then helps himself to a pair of new shoes from the peddler's case. The shoes are too tight and the soles are slippery, but Renard insists Pedott clarify if they are what he needs and what he should do now that he is wearing them. The peddler makes cryptic remarks that do not satisfy Renard; he advances threateningly on the older man. In the wet street, he slips for a moment and, as he is regaining his footing, a car approaches.  Renard cannot get out of the way and is struck and killed. The shoes, Pedott explains to Renard's corpse, were what Pedott needed, because he foresaw that Renard in the future would kill him.

Shortly, as people gather at the scene, Pedott gives a man a comb, which he uses to groom himself just before he and his wife are photographed as witnesses for a newspaper story covering the accident that has killed Renard.

Closing narration

Production information
The original story featured a machine that could foretell an individual's probable future. In the story, the man owns a shop where he has such a machine and then gives people what they need to provide the best possible outcomes; also, the Renard character is killed not by a car but by falling off a subway platform while a train is coming into the station. This version of the story aired on a 1952 episode of the anthology series Tales of Tomorrow, changing the death of the Renard character from a fall to being hit by a car. For his version, Serling replaced the science-fiction element with a street peddler who could magically perform the same function.

The final shot before the first commercial (while Serling is concluding his narration) is actually played backwards; looking carefully, one can see smoke returning to Renard's cigarette.

During the scene in Mr. Renard's hotel room, a bellhop brings him a newspaper. Renard then opens it and spreads it out on the floor. The movement is quick, but the front page of the newspaper is visible, indicating that it is the same front page used in another Twilight Zone episode, "Time Enough at Last". The headline reads "H-Bomb Capable of Total Destruction". Once Renard opens the paper and looks at the racing page, several in-jokes or Easter eggs are apparent in the names of the listed jockeys, which include "Serling", "Clemens" (referencing director of photography George Clemens), "Houghton" (referencing producer Buck Houghton), "Butler" (referencing set decorator Rudy Butler), and "Denault" (referencing assistant director Edward Denault).

References

Zicree, Marc Scott: The Twilight Zone Companion.  Sillman-James Press, 1982 (second edition)
DeVoe, Bill. (2008). Trivia from The Twilight Zone. Albany, GA: Bear Manor Media. 
Grams, Martin. (2008). The Twilight Zone: Unlocking the Door to a Television Classic. Churchville, MD: OTR Publishing.

External links
 

1959 American television episodes
Television episodes about death
Television shows based on short fiction
The Twilight Zone (1959 TV series season 1) episodes
Works published under a pseudonym